Cecil Eugene Diggs Haney (born December 1, 1955) is a retired United States Navy admiral who served as Commander, United States Strategic Command (STRATCOM) from November 15, 2013 to November 3, 2016. Prior to STRATCOM, he served as Commander, United States Pacific Fleet. He received the Defense Distinguished Service Medal, the Navy Distinguished Service Medal, the Defense Superior Service Medal, and the Legion of Merit.

Early life and education
Haney was born and raised in Washington, D.C., graduating from the United States Naval Academy in 1978, where he received a Bachelor of Science degree in Ocean Engineering. He holds master's degrees in Engineering Acoustics and System Technology from the Naval Postgraduate School, and a master's degree in National Security Strategy from the National Defense University.

Naval career

Haney commanded Submarine Squadron 1 from June 2002 to July 2004, and Submarine Group 2 from October 2006 to March 2008.

Haney's shore duty tours include administrative assistant for enlisted affairs at Naval Reactors, and congressional appropriations liaison officer for the Office of the Secretary of Defense (Comptroller); Deputy Chief of Staff of Plans, Policies and Requirements, U.S. Pacific Fleet (N5N8); and director, Submarine Warfare Division (N87); director, Naval Warfare Integration Group (N00X) and deputy commander, U.S. Strategic Command, Offutt Air Force Base, Nebraska.

Haney assumed his assignment as Commander, United States Pacific Fleet on January 20, 2012.

Haney relinquished command of the United States Strategic Command on November 3, 2016 to General John E. Hyten.

Retirement
Haney serves on the Johns Hopkins University Applied Physics Laboratory Board of Managers. On March 6, 2019, General Dynamics elected Haney as a member of its board of directors.

Awards and decorations

Haney was the 1998 Vice Admiral James Bond Stockdale Award for Inspirational Leadership recipient for the Pacific fleet.

References

External links

|-

1955 births
Military personnel from Washington, D.C.
Living people
United States Navy admirals
African-American United States Navy personnel
Recipients of the Defense Superior Service Medal
Recipients of the Defense Distinguished Service Medal
Recipients of the Legion of Merit
United States Naval Academy alumni
Recipients of the Vice Admiral James Bond Stockdale Award for Inspirational Leadership
Recipients of the Navy Distinguished Service Medal
21st-century African-American people
20th-century African-American people
Eastern High School (Washington, D.C.) alumni